Timothy Suhrstedt,  (born August 5, 1948) is an American cinematographer. He is best known for his work on comedies like Little Miss Sunshine, Office Space, The Wedding Singer, and 17 Again.

Filmography
His credits include:

Chicago Hope (TV series) 
(Won Primetime Emmy Award for Outstanding Individual Achievement in Cinematography for a Series in 1996)

Feature films

Other credits

They Went That-A-Way & That-A-Way (1978) (first assistant camera)
Island of the Fishmen (1979) (assistant camera: additional sequences, US version)
Home Movies (1979) (assistant camera)
The Prize Fighter (1979) (first assistant camera)
Don't Answer the Phone (1980) (first assistant camera)
The Private Eyes (1980) (camera operator) / (director of photography: second unit)
Delusion (1980) (first assistant camera)
Lifepod (1981) (first assistant camera)
Circle of Power (1981) (camera operator)
Bachelor Party (1984) (additional photographer)
Off the Mark (1987) (stunt camera operator)
Buffy the Vampire Slayer (1992) (director of photography: additional photography)
Down to You (2000) (director of photography: additional photography)
As Cool as I Am (2013) (camera operator: 'b' camera)

Television films

The Ratings Game (1984)
And the Children Shall Lead (1985)
Slow Burn (1986)
J. Edgar Hoover (1987)
Lady Mobster (1988)
Dead Solid Perfect (1988)
The Cover Girl and the Cop (1989)
She Knows Too Much (1989)
The Revenge of Al Capone (1989)
Spooner (1989)
Man Against the Mob: The Chinatown Murders (1989)
Pair of Aces (1990)
Rainbow Drive (1990)
Country Estates (1993)
Rise and Walk: The Dennis Byrd Story (1994)
The Innocent (1994)
111 Gramercy Park (2003)
The Line-Up (2007)
Truth Be Told (2011)

References

External links

1948 births
Living people
American cinematographers
Artists from Baltimore
Primetime Emmy Award winners